Jason Elliott Stollsteimer (born April 22, 1978) is an American musician who was the vocalist and guitarist for the indie rock band The Von Bondies, which took a break in 2011. Stollsteimer also was the main songwriter and producer of the Von Bondies. He released three studio albums with The Von Bondies, one studio album with Hounds Below and is currently playing with PONYSHOW.

Musical career

Lack of Communication
His debut album, Lack of Communication, was released in 2001 on Sympathy for the Record Industry.  Jason toured the states with the first incarnation of The Von Bondies featuring longtime friend Carrie Smith on the bass, Don Blum on drums and Marcie Bolen (Silverghost, Slumber Party) on Guitar. Over ten U.S. tours were done in order to help promote the record. The group shared the stage with The Cramps,  on their 8th US tour. Jason and The Von Bondies also played several shows in the U.K. and Europe and a live performance on the Later... with Jools Holland in London.

Raw & Rare
In 2003 the Von Bondies released a live record that consisted mostly of recording from live BBC recordings from the John Peel sessions.

Pawn Shoppe Heart
In 2004, Stollsteimer released his second studio album, Pawn Shoppe Heart, and toured extensively in the US, UK, and Europe

"C'mon C'mon" was the first single and reached the UK Top 25 for the first time (peaking at #21), and also generated some huge buzz for Stollsteimer.

One other single was released from the album. "Tell me what you see" which reached number 43 in the UK charts. Almost every track from the album has appeared in numerous commercials, Movies and TV shows.  One song in particular (c'mon c'mon) was used more than all the others combined. From uses in local radio commercials/adverts to the main theme song of the hit F/X television show Rescue Me.
While touring this record Stollsteimer played the Reading and Leeds Festivals, Glastonbury Festival and Coachella Valley Music and Arts Festival

Love, Hate and Then There's You
Jason Stollsteimer's last release with the Von Bondies, "Love, Hate and Then There's You," has gone through a long process of discovery and change before coming to its current polished form.

In early 2006, a handful of demos  were posted on the Von Bondies Myspace page. Later the band posted more songs on the MySpace page including "Shut Your Mouth," "Pale Bride," and "Only to Haunt You." Don Blum played drums on these recordings with all other instruments played by Jason. 
Love, Hate and Then There's You was the first time Stollsteimer ever collaborated songwriting with anyone.  The songs 'This is our perfect crime" and "Accidents will Happen" were co-written with Butch Walker who also produced some songs on the album.  The songs "blame game" and "Earthquake" were co-written with longtime drummer Don Blum.  The album was eventually released in 2009 on Majordomo Records.

Hounds Below
Stollsteimer later became the frontman for Hounds Below, which he established in 2009 and had focused on full-time following the breakup of the Von Bondies. Hounds Below released their debut album, You Light Me Up In the Dark, in 2012.

PONYSHOW
Stollsteimer was the frontman for PONYSHOW, which he established in 2014 with two of his former Von Bondie bandmates, Don Blum and Leann Banks.

Personal life
Stollsteimer was born in Southfield, Michigan.  His mother was a nurse, and his father an architect. He grew up in the Detroit suburbs of Plymouth, Michigan with his one brother, Eric. As a child, he went to school at Plymouth-Canton Educational Park.  He later lived in Ann Arbor/Ypsilanti, where in 1997 he became friends with his new schoolmate at College, Marcie Bolen, who would become his band's first guitarist. A year later, while studying at Washtenaw Community College, Stollsteimer met Don Blum who would eventually become his drummer in the band The Von Bondies.

Jason currently resides in metro-Detroit and works full time as a real estate agent.

Musical equipment
Guitars:
 Eko Condor – Sunburst
 Gibson ES-345 (stereo)
 Mosrite Celebrity – Sunburst
 Fender Jaguar Special HH – Black
 Fender Jazzmaster – Sunburst

Effects pedals:
 Electro-harmonix Big Muff
 Colorsound Tone-bender Fuzz

Amplifiers:
 1969 Fender Pro Reverb
 Fender Twin
 Fender Concert Reverb
 Silvertone 1485 6x10"
 Fender Hot Rod DeVille

Controversy
Stollsteimer and Jack White of The White Stripes had a confrontation on December 13, 2003, at the Majestic Theatre Center, in a Detroit night-club called The Magic Stick. This was the second time the two had been in a physical altercation over the unresolved issues surrounding the production credit that Jim Diamond believed he deserved on the 2001 Von Bondies album, Lack of Communication. Diamond and the rest of the Von Bondies both agreed that Diamond did most of the production work, but White denied their claims and personally placed his own name on the credits of the album as the sole producer, which led to the brawl. Additionally, Diamond was also suing the White Stripes at the time claiming he produced their two earliest albums, which may have added fuel to the conflict.  The first attack was one year earlier, also in Detroit.  White's and Stollsteimer's police reports on the incident contradict each other as to who started the scuffle.  In March 2004, White pleaded guilty to assault and battery, was made to pay $750 (including court costs) and to attend anger management classes.

See also
 The Von Bondies
 Indie rock
 Garage rock revival
 Hounds Below

References

1978 births
Living people
American rock guitarists
American male guitarists
American rock singers
Musicians from Ann Arbor, Michigan
People from Plymouth, Michigan
Singers from Michigan
Guitarists from Michigan
21st-century American singers
21st-century American guitarists
21st-century American male singers